Sweet Sixteen is a British sitcom that aired on BBC1 in 1983. It stars Penelope Keith and was written by Douglas Watkinson and directed and produced by Gareth Gwenlan.

Plot
Helen Morgan (Nee Carrington and Formerly Walker) is the no-nonsense and independent 41-year-old head of a successful local building firm known as Carrington and Daughter, founded by her late father (John Carrington) and leads a rather affluent lifestyle with her luxury Jaguar and all the trappings. However, her life is turned upside down when she falls in love with Peter Morgan, her young, attractive and recently recruited Architect who is 16 years younger than she. After a torrid beginning, time softens and he also falls in love with her after she has become pregnant with his child, despite already having a 19-year-old son James (Jimmy) Walker. Jimmy is a history student from her previous marriage to Mr. Walker (deceased). After the two marry in a registrars office, they move into a cozy property that Helen has sourced as part of her business dealings (Church Farm) through Hartshorn Jr. who is her dopey agent. He wants nothing more than to be liked by her so after buying that and a 4ac development site known as "Askett Field" which is also part of the story.  The story remained largely unresolved as low viewing figures meant a second series was not commissioned and the series was never repeated on any BBC channel.

Cast
Penelope Keith – Helen Walker – Director of Carrington and Daughter 
Christopher Villiers – Peter Morgan – Architect and Love Interest/Husband
John Rapley – Arthur Poole – Helen's Faithful Building Supervisor
 Sheila Fay – Millie Poole – Arthur's Wife and the Morgan's Housekeeper
Joan Blackham – Jane – Helen's Secretary
Mike Grady – Dr Ballantine the Local GP
Matthew Solon – James Walker – James (Jimmy) Walker – Helen's Son (b.1964) 
Victor Spinetti – Ken Green – Helen's Accountant

David Neville as Tony Hartshorn of Hartshorn and Hartshorn ( Helen's Dopey Estate Agent)

Richard E. Grant made his first screen appearance, playing Anton in Episode Six.

Episodes
Episode One (16 October 1983)
Episode Two (23 October 1983)
Episode Three (30 October 1983)
Episode Four (6 November 1983)
Episode Five (13 November 1983)
Episode Six (20 November 1983)

References
Notes

Sources
Mark Lewisohn, "Radio Times Guide to TV Comedy", BBC Worldwide Ltd, 2003
British TV Comedy Guide for Sweet Sixteen

External links

1983 British television series debuts
1983 British television series endings
1980s British sitcoms
BBC television sitcoms